Esteban Berisso (born 17 April 1937) is an Argentine sailor. He competed in the Finn event at the 1956 Summer Olympics.

References

External links
 

1937 births
Living people
Argentine male sailors (sport)
Olympic sailors of Argentina
Sailors at the 1956 Summer Olympics – Finn
Place of birth missing (living people)